The 2017 Superbike World Championship was the 30th season of the Superbike World Championship. The season was contested over 26 races at 13 locations, starting on 25 February at Phillip Island Grand Prix Circuit in Australia and ending on 4 November at Losail International Circuit in Qatar.

The season saw the revision of the starting grid format for the second race, which was previously based on qualifying results for both races: riders placed from fourth to ninth in Race 1 were promoted to the first two rows for Race 2; then the third, the second and the winner followed on the third row; the remaining riders were sorted from the tenth grid slot onwards according to Superpole results.

The season was marred by the death of Honda rider and former MotoGP World Champion Nicky Hayden, who succumbed to injuries sustained in a pedal-cycling accident near Rimini, Italy, on 22 May.

Race calendar and results

Entry list 

All entries used Pirelli tyres.

Championship standings

Riders' championship

Bold – Pole positionItalics – Fastest lap

Manufacturers' championship

References 

Superbike World Championship seasons
World